

1950

Non-circulating coins

1951

Non-circulating coins

1952

Non-circulating coins

1953

Non-circulating coins

1954

Non-circulated coins

References 

Commemorative coins of the United States